Slavko Avsenik Jr. (April 9, 1958 in Ljubljana) is a Slovenian composer and pianist. He is also the author of numerous children's songs.  He is the son of the Slavko Avsenik.

Biography
Avsenik graduated from the Academy of Music and Dramatic Arts in Graz in jazz piano, in 1981, and film music composition at Berklee College of Music in Boston in 1985.

During and after college he worked as a composer, arranger and producer, first in Ljubljana, then KOCH International in Austria and as a music editor at Arioli BMG in Germany.

He creates film scores and produces music for film, TV, theater, multimedia, using a wide assortment of genres of pop music, and music for children.

Avsenik collaborates with industrial music group Laibach on their album Opus dei.

Awards
 1981 Award of the Austrian Ministry of Culture
 1993 Župančičeva Prix

Filmography
 Opus Films: Remington (1988)
 The Wind in the Network (1990)
 Heart Lady (1992)
 Moran (1993)
 A Tale of Awakening (1993)
 Traveling Božidar Jakac (1994)
 Dogged (1995)
 Used Fresco (1995)
 Felix (1996)
 The Abyss (1998)
 Socialization of a Bull (1998)
 Faces of the Green River (1999)
 Hop, Skip and Jump (2000)
 In the Kingdom of Marmots (2004)

Theater
 LOVRAČ, Fugitive, Bear With a Rose (A), Jeppe S Hill, Velden 200th
 LET F. Prešeren
 Lefend OF Kamniške Veronika
 STORY Soldier R. MAISTRA, Hansel and Gretel, Cuore (A)

Discography
 Šmentana muha 
 Spanckaj glasba za dojencke 
 Izdano na medijih

See also
List of Slovenian composers

References

Slovenian composers
Male composers
Slovenian jazz pianists
1958 births
Living people
Musicians from Ljubljana
University of Graz alumni
21st-century pianists
Slovenian male musicians